The village of Mohan Majra is situated in District Fatehgarh Sahib, Punjab, India. It is about 2 km away from Sanghol .

Fatehgarh Sahib
Villages in Fatehgarh Sahib district